Concrete Gardens is the eleventh studio album by guitarist Tony MacAlpine, released on April 21, 2015, through Sun Dog Records. The album was first announced by MacAlpine on his official website in October 2013, with more details in February and December 2014. An official release date was announced in March 2015, along with the cover art, different editions of the album, and a U.S. tour schedule. To further promote Concrete Gardens, a series of live studio performances of several songs were filmed for EMGtv, featuring guitarist Nili Brosh, drummer Aquiles Priester, and bassist Pete Griffin. Guitarist Jeff Loomis is featured as a guest soloist on "Square Circles".

Critical reception

Aaron Small at Brave Words & Bloody Knuckles gave Concrete Gardens a rating of 8.0, praising MacAlpine's skill at creating instrumental melodies in place of lyrics, "thereby building unique songs full of colourful character." He listed "Exhibitionist Blvd", "Man in a Metal Cage", "Napoleon's Puppet" and "Confessions of a Medieval Monument" as highlights, but criticism was directed at the final track, the instrumental piano piece "Maiden's Wish", for sounding out of place on the album and more appropriate for the early 1900s silent film era.

Track listing

Personnel
Tony MacAlpine – guitar, keyboard, bass (tracks 2, 3, 5, 10), production
Jeff Loomis – guitar solo (track 8)
Aquiles Priester – drums
Pete Griffin – bass (tracks 1, 4, 6–8)
Lucky Islam – bass (track 9)
Sean Delson – bass (track 11)
Adair Daufembach – mixing
Seva David Ball – mastering
Michael Mesker – executive production

References

External links
Interview with Tony MacAlpine at The Musician's Talk Show

Tony MacAlpine albums
2015 albums
Albums recorded in a home studio